The Ultracraft Calypso is a family of Belgian homebuilt aircraft designed and produced by Ultracraft of Heusden-Zolder, introduced in the 1990s. The aircraft is supplied as a complete ready-to-fly aircraft or as a kit for amateur construction.

Design and development
The Calypso line all feature a strut-braced high wing, fixed conventional landing gear with optional wheel pants and a single engine in tractor configuration.

The single-seat Calypso 1 is made from a combination of wood and metal with its flying surfaces covered in doped aircraft fabric and a fibreglass cowling.

The manufacturer estimates the construction time for the Calypso 1A from the supplied kit to be 300 hours.

Operational history
By 1998 the company reported that 12 kits had been sold and five Calypso 1s were completed and flying.

Variants

Calypso 1A
Initial version, single-seat with  engine.
Calypso 1B
Single-seat version with Citroën Visa automotive conversion engine or  Rotax 582 two-stroke, liquid-cooled powerplant.
Calypso 2A
Calypso 2B

Specifications (Calypso 1A)

References

External links

Calypso
1990s Belgian sport aircraft
1990s Belgian ultralight aircraft
1990s Belgian civil utility aircraft
Single-engined tractor aircraft
High-wing aircraft
Homebuilt aircraft